Bronx Preparatory Charter School is a public middle and high school in the South Bronx. Comprising students in grades 5-12, Bronx Prep graduated its first class of seniors in June 2007.  The school is located in a modern facility designed and constructed by GLUCK+ Architects specifically for Bronx Prep at 3872 Third Avenue.

History 
The founder of Bronx Prep is Kristin Kearns Jordan. She was also the first executive director of Bronx Prep until 2007, when she passed the reins to Dr. Samona Tait-Johnson. The position of director was subsequently renamed Head of School. Following Dr. Tait's tenure, Edwina Branch Smith served as Head of School. Nancy Garvey and Debbie Evangelakos, both Bronx Prep Board members at the time, then served as interim Co-Heads of School. In 2014 the school was taken over by the charter school organization Democracy Prep, and is now called Democracy Prep Bronx Prep.

Bronx Prep opened its doors in 2000 with its inaugural class of 100 5th and 6th graders. As one of fourteen schools chartered by the SUNY Charter Schools Institute out of ninety applicants in 1999, Bronx Prep was one of the first schools to be re-chartered for a full five-year term in 2004.  In 2004 the school moved to the building which formerly occupied Junior High School 149 on 149th St. and Willis Avenue. Bronx Prep reached capacity of 700-800 students in grades 5-12 by 2011.

The combination of a middle and high school makes Bronx Prep unique among charter schools in New York City. This was done to prepare students for enrollment at competitive colleges.

One hundred percent of Bronx Prep's first high school graduating class, in 2007, were accepted to four-year colleges. The colleges to which these students earned admission include: Georgetown, NYU, Holy Cross, Syracuse, Fordham, SUNY-Albany, CUNY-City College, Hunter College, and Lehman College.

Academics 
Charter schools are public schools which receive public funds through operate independently from local school boards. Bronx Prep is accountable to the SUNY Charter Schools Institute and the charter is up for renewal every five years. Students for Bronx Prep are selected through a lottery system and enter Bronx Prep as fifth/sixth graders. Selected students attend middle school at Bronx Prep, and then, upon successful completion of requirements, are promoted to Bronx Prep's high school.

The high school at Bronx Prep has many similarities to other New York City public high schools. Students at Bronx Prep take Regents exams in all of their core subjects.  High school students, called visionaries and luminaries, attend college trips across the country. Bronx Prep also offers Advanced Placement courses, including AP Calculus AB, AP Calculus BC, AP English-Language, AP English-Literature, AP Spanish-Language, AP Environmental Science, AP Global History, AP US History and AP Statistics.

Extracurricular activities 
Bronx Prep students participate in extracurricular activities in the Charter School Athletics League and the National Forensics League. Some extracurricular activities at Bronx Prep combine the middle school and high school.

Extracurricular Activities available at Bronx Prep include:
Theater,
Student Council,
Speech/Forensics,
Math Team,
Science Olympiad,
Seekers Club,
National Honor Society,
Cheerleading,
Middle School and High School Boys and Girls Basketball,
Soccer (Boys and Girls),
Girls Volleyball,
Baseball,
Softball, and
Flag football (Co-Ed).

Footnotes

References 
 New York State School Report Card, 2006-2007 Accountability and Overview Report, Bronx Preparatory Charter School 2006-07
Bronx Prep Website
POSTINGS: At Third Avenue and East 172nd Street; Charter School Rises in Bronx On Hill of Gifts, NYTimes, May 30, 2004,
Repetition + Rap = Charter School Success, NY Times, June 6, 2001
New Curriculum in Bronx Is Built on an Ideal, NYTimes August 23, 2000,

External links 
 
 

Public high schools in the Bronx
Public middle schools in the Bronx
Charter schools in New York City